{{Infobox road
|country = VNM
|alternate_name =   Đường cao tốc Bắc–Nam phía Đông
|type = Expressway
|route =01
|marker_image = 
|map = Vietnam CT.01 Map.png
|map_notes = Map of the CT.01 expressway with operational (blue) and under construction (pink) sections
|length_km = 2063
|length_ref =
|status = Under construction
|established = 1/1/2002() 3/2/2010 Expressway
|direction_a = North
|terminus_a =  in Lạng Sơn
|junction =   at Ninh Hiệp, Hanoi    at Thanh Trì Bridge, Hanoi     at Pháp Vân, Hoàng Mai, Hanoi 
 at Lo 25, Thống Nhất, Đồng Nai
|direction_b = South
|terminus_b =  Cà Mau
|provinces=LS, BG, BN, HN, HNa, NĐ, NB, TH, NA, HT, QB, QT, TTH, DNa, QNa, QNg, BĐ, PY, KH, NT, BT, ĐN, HCMC, LA, TG, ĐT, VL, CT, HG, BL, KG, CM
|previous_type = 
|previous_route =
|next_type = CT
|next_route = 2
}}
The North–South Expressway East (Vietnamese: Đường cao tốc Bắc–Nam phía Đông'') is the most common name of an expressway in Vietnam located very close to National Route 1 an artery, smoothly between the two South and North Vietnam. Similar to National Route 1, the expressway starts from Lạng Sơn and ends at Cà Mau.

The control points of the expressway have also been identified, located in the Eastern Transport Corridor, running almost parallel to the upgraded and expanded National Highway 1. The North-South Expressway was built with 18 sections with nodes: Lạng Sơn, Hà Nội, Ninh Bình, Thanh Hóa, Hà Tĩnh, Quảng Trị, Đà Nẵng, Quảng Ngãi, Bình Định, Nha Trang, Phan Thiết, Dầu Giây, Long Thành, Bến Lức,HCMC - Trung Luong, My Thuan, Cần Thơ and Cà Mau with a total cost estimate of VND 350 trillion (equivalent to US$18.5 billion).

History

Background and current situation
The transport corridor on the north–south axis from Lang Son to Ca Mau plays a very important role: connecting the political center of Hanoi Capital with the economic center of Ho Chi Minh City, passing through 32 affected provinces and cities. to 62.1% of the population, contributing 65.7% of the gross domestic product, affecting 74% of seaports (classes I, II), 75% of economic regions of the country and especially connecting 4 key economic regions (North, Central, South and Mekong Delta), connecting to 16 out of 23 airports with 91% of passenger traffic. This is the most important transport corridor in the transport infrastructure system of Vietnam.

In 2019, the Ministry of Transport decided to exclude foreign investors from bidding on the North-South Expressway, mainly to prevent Chinese companies from participating. Public backslash was feared if Chinese companies would collect toll fees, due to strong anti-Chinese sentiment in the country, and national security concerns played a part as well. However, lack of bidders has led to low competition between the bids, and two out of five sections had not attracted any bids.

According to 2017 estimates, yearly total transport volume over Vietnam's north-south corridor would be 45.37 million passengers and 62.27 million tons of goods by 2020, which would exceed the capacity of current infrastructure by 10% to 25%. Four goals of the project have been formulated by the Ministry of Transport:
 Allow the economy to be more competitive within ASEAN and the WTO.
 Improve transportation capacity and speed along the North-South transport corridor.
 Promoto socio-economic development and ensure national security.
 Connect the capital and political centre Hanoi and the economic centre Ho Chi Minh City with the 4 key economic zones, urban areas, key industrial zones, border gates and international seaports.
 North, Central and Southern Vietnam, and Mekong Delta

The implementation of investment in expressways has not been rational, and has not been distributed harmoniously among key economic regions, dynamic regions and disadvantaged areas.

History
The idea of building the North-South Expressway appeared before 2010, when the demand for road travel between provinces along the north-south axis increased rapidly, while the existing National Route 1 was overloaded. although it has been widened at least four lanes, and at the same time build a new route avoiding urban areas. However, the expansion capacity of National Route 1 becomes limited because people live on both sides of the road, so the cost of clearing is very large. In addition, National Route 1 almost all sections run along the same corridor with North–South Railway, the possibility of expansion is not feasible. The construction of the North-South Expressway as well as other expressway systems in Vietnam aims to separate passenger cars, non-stop passenger cars and long-distance trucks from the traffic of rudimentary vehicles and two- to three-wheelers, passenger cars, passenger cars often pick up and drop off passengers along the road and trucks, creating conditions for long-distance vehicles to run faster and safer.

The predecessors of the North-South Expressways are the Phap Van–Cau Gie bypass completed in 1998, along with the NH1 bypass, the Phap Van–Bac Giang section. At that time, these roads were only bypasses of National Highway 1 and did not meet expressway standards. In 2012, the East North-South Expressway running through the two areas above was built on the basis of upgrading the existing bypass, building overpasses at sections through Phap Van urban area and parallel roads for two-wheelers. 

The first expressway completed in the North-South Expressway system is Phap Van–Cau Gie Expressway, which opened to traffic in 2002.

However, the system planning for the 2021-2030 period has been adjusted. Accordingly, two expressways Hanoi–Lang Son (old CT.03) and Can Tho–Ca Mau expressway (old CT.19) are combined into the North–South Expressway planning.

Expressway planning

2010
The detailed planning of the entire North-South expressway east of CT.01 was announced by the Prime Minister in January 2010. There are 16 main sections of the route from north to south. The total length of the route from Hanoi to Can Tho is 1811 km.

2021
In September 2021, the Government announced the Road Network Plan for the 2021–2030 period, with a vision to 2050, re-planned the North-South Expressway from Huu Nghi border gate (Cao Lộc, Lạng Sơn) to Ca Mau city (Ca Mau province) with a length of about 2,063 km, scale from 4 to 10 lanes. The whole route is divided into 3 major segments, the Hanoi to Can Tho segment is CT.01 in the 2010 master plan. The total number of subdivided sections is 38. All will be built before 2030.

Segment of Huu Nghi Border Gate - Phap Van

 Segment of Hanoi - Can Tho

 Segment of Can Tho - Ca Mau

Investment stages 
The entire expressway construction process is divided into several stages, each phase building a number of smaller routes in the larger sections. The plan for budget construction and use of each period is approved by the National Assembly of Vietnam. As follows:
 In the period of 2017–2020, the investment is for 654 km, the total investment is VND 118,716 billion 

 In the 2021–2025 period, an additional 729 km will be invested, with a total investment of VND 148,492 billion (of which the State budget is VND 131,217 billion and capital from private partners is VND 17,125 billion).

Status

 Note

References

Road transport in Vietnam
Expressways in Vietnam